Yavor Dimitrov Yanakiev (born 16 May 1985), better known by his stage name 100 Kila (also stylized as 100KILA), is a Bulgarian rapper, actor, songwriter and entrepreneur from Varna. His stage name is a short form of the phrase "100 kilograms" in Bulgarian.

Biography

Early life
Yanakiev was born and raised in a Romani neighborhood of concentrated poverty in Asparuhovo, Varna. He lived with his parents and brother, until their father left them. In the mid 90s his mother moved to Greece, in hopes of sustaining her family and to encourage Yavor's education. His parents separated when he was 6. Yavor subsequently moved to his grandmother's home in Targovishte where he studied in school until the 8th grade, before eventually dropping out due to absence and low grades.

Career
In the early 2000s, Yanakiev started his musical career after meeting prominent Bulgarian rapper Big Sha. He was immediately signed to his record label R&B Records and enjoyed several successful years in the label alongside several other artists such as Vanko 1, Konsa, Gumeni Glavi and Loshite. He also achieved great notoriety with the singles "" featuring Consa and "Chiki-Na-Na" by Gumeni Glavi respectively. He also featured on the Big Sha songs "" (Bass rhythm) and "" (The cops are onto me).

Yanakiev also participated in the first season of the Bulgarian version of the show The Mole. He also shot 1 episode for the Bulgarian TV Series Domashen Arest (House Arrest) in 2013. In 2015 he joined Sofia Residents in Excess cast for season 9.

On April 9, 2016, 100 Kila released a remix version of the song "Babuli Jabulah" from his 2013 album ZLA10 as a single featuring American rapper Rick Ross.

Discography

Singles

Albums 
 По-добре гаден, отколкото гладен (2003)
 Прехода на Просветения (2009)
 ZLA10 (2013)

Filmography

References

1985 births
Living people
Musicians from Varna, Bulgaria
Bulgarian rappers
Bulgarian people of Romani descent
Romani rappers